Montréal (Languedocien: Montreal) is a commune just west of Carcassonne in the Aude department, a part of the ancient Languedoc province and the present-day Occitanie region in southern France.

History
In 1206 Montréal was the site of debates between Catholics and Cathars, a sect of Christianity whose beliefs ran contrary to the teachings of the Catholic Church. These debates were initiated by a Spanish bishop Diego of Osma and his canon, the future Saint Dominic, as part of Pope Innocent III's program to convert the Cathars in the area to Catholicism.

Population

See also
Communes of the Aude department

References

Communes of Aude
Aude communes articles needing translation from French Wikipedia